Social metabolism or socioeconomic metabolism is the set of flows of materials and energy that occur between nature and society, between different societies, and within societies. These human-controlled material and energy flows are a basic feature of all societies but their magnitude and diversity largely depend on specific cultures, or sociometabolic regimes.
Social or socioeconomic metabolism is also described as "the self-reproduction and evolution of the biophysical structures of human society. It comprises those biophysical transformation processes, distribution processes, and flows, which are controlled by humans for their purposes. The biophysical structures of society (‘in use stocks’) and socioeconomic metabolism together form the biophysical basis of society."

Social metabolic processes begin with the human appropriation of materials and energy from nature. These can be transformed and circulated to be consumed and excreted finally back to nature itself. Each of these processes has a different environmental impact depending on how it is performed, the amount of materials and energy involved in the process, the area where it occurs, the time available or nature's regenerative capacity.

Social metabolism represents an extension of the metabolism concept from biological organisms like human bodies to the biophysical basis of society. Humans build and operate mines and farms, oil refineries and power stations, factories and infrastructure to supply the energy and material flows needed for the physical reproduction of a specific culture. In-use stocks, which comprise buildings, vehicles, appliances, infrastructure, etc., are built up and maintained by the different industrial processes that are part of social metabolism. These stocks then provide services to people in the form of shelter, transportation, or communication.

Society and its metabolism together form an autopoietic system, a complex system that reproduces itself. Neither culture nor social metabolism can reproduce themselves in isolation. Humans need food and shelter, which is delivered by social metabolism, and the latter needs humans to operate it.

Studies of social metabolism can be carried out at different levels of system aggregation, see material flow analysis. In material flow accounting, for example, the inputs and outputs of materials and energy of a particular state or region, as well as imports and exports, are analysed. Such studies are facilitated by the ease of access to information about commercial transactions.

Social or socioeconomic metabolism stipulates that human society and its interaction with nature form a complex self-reproducing system, and it can therefore be seen as paradigm for studying the biophysical basis of human societies under the aspect of self-reproduction. "A common paradigm can facilitate model combination and integration, which can lead to more robust and comprehensive interdisciplinary assessments of sustainable development strategies. ... The use of social or socioeconomic metabolism as paradigm can help to justify alternative economic concepts."

Origins of the concept 
The concept of social metabolism emerged in the nineteenth century, which was a time of scientific integration and reciprocity among naturalists and social scholars. The evolutionary perspective, particularly analogical reasoning, provided crossties between natural and social sciences.

It was only in the late 1970s that the human exceptionalism paradigm was rigorously questioned, leading to the birth of environmental sociology.

See also

References 

Cultural economics
Ecological economics
Social ecology
Economic theories
Economics and climate change
Energy economics
Environmental economics
Interdisciplinary subfields of sociology
Marxist terminology
Political economy
Resource extraction
Sustainable development